Ischnura aurora, the gossamer damselfy or golden dartlet and also known as the aurora bluetail, is a species of damselfly in the family Coenagrionidae.

Adults 

A small apple green damselfly with black thoracic stripes and blue tipped yellow tail.

Male

Eyes: Black half moon-like cap above, olive green to dark olive below, which fades to pale olive beneath. Two azure blue spots are present behind the eyes. Thorax: Shining black with two pale grass green stripes; sides are light green and white below. Legs: Pale greenish white with a vertical stripe on the femur, just above the femur - tibia joint. Wings: Transparent. Wing spots: The wing spots are different in fore and hindwings, being rose-red on the forewings and uniform pale grey on the hindwings. Abdomen: Bright reddish yellow. The upper parts of the second and seventh segments have narrow and broad black marks, respectively. A third of the length of the eighth segment and the full length of the ninth segment are blue. The base color of the eighth segment tergite is melanic black.

Female

Eyes: Brown half moon-like cap above, green to pale green below. Thorax: Shining black with two orange stripes; sides are pale green. Legs: Pale white with vertical black stripes on femur, just above femur - tibia joint. Abdomen: A broad black stripe runs along the upper side of abdomen. The eight to tenth segments do not have azure blue markings.

Habitat 
Found among vegetation along the banks of ponds, rivers, canals, marshes and wet rice fields.

Distribution 
It is found across Australia, the Pacific Islands, East Asia and Southeast Asia. There are strong differences in DNA between the Asian forms of the species and specimens from the Pacific. The form found on the Indian subcontinent and in Iran is Ischnura aurora rubilio (Selys, 1876) and is now considered a different taxon, Ischnura rubilio.

Gallery

See also 
 List of Odonata species of Australia

References

External links 

Ischnura
Odonata of Australia
Odonata of Oceania
Insects of Australia
Taxa named by Friedrich Moritz Brauer
Insects described in 1865
Damselflies